Edna O'Shaughnessy (26 September 1924 – 25 January 2022) was a South African-born British Kleinian psychoanalyst.

Training
O'Shaughnessy trained in philosophy, which she taught at Oxford, before re-training as a child psychotherapist at the Tavistock Clinic. She subsequently became an analyst and training analyst with the British Psychoanalytical Society.

Theoretical contributions
O'Shaughnessy explored the role of projections in the psychotic, noting how they can be "loaded with enormous hostility; they are weapons - boomerangs which destroy the foundations for intuitive knowledge of the self and object".

In the tradition of W. R. Bion, she emphasized the importance of thinking in forming object relations, noting how failure to integrate observation and experience (due to fear of loss of omnipotence) can prevent the formation of, and working through of the Oedipal triangle.

Personal life and death
O'Shaughnessy died on 25 January 2022, at the age of 97 and was buried with her husband, the philosopher Brian O'Shaughnessy on the eastern side of Highgate Cemetery.

See also

References

Further reading
 Edna O'Shaughessy, 'Words and working through' International Journal of Psycho-Analysis (1983) 64:281-9
 Richard Rusbridger ed., Inquiries in Psychoanalysis: Collected Papers of Edna O'Shaughnessyy (2014)

External links 
 Biographical profile hosted by the British Psychoanalytical Society

1924 births
2022 deaths
Burials at Highgate Cemetery
20th-century British women scientists
British psychoanalysts
South African emigrants to the United Kingdom
White South African people